Roger Orton (c. 1799 – 1851) was an early Mormon leader and non-functioning member of the First Seven Presidents of the Seventy of the Church of Jesus Christ of Latter-day Saints.

Orton was born in Genesco, New York and married Clarissa Mary Bicknell around 1823. Together they had six children. He was baptized about 1833, and in 1834 he left with Joseph Smith, Jr. and others on a mission to Pontiac, Michigan. He participated in Zion's Camp, where he served as a captain of the camp. During battle practice on the camp, he accidentally sliced open the hand of a participant. Later, through his negligence, he allowed several horses to run off. Instead of going after them himself, he simply informed the owners of what had happened, expecting them to go after the steeds. The horses turned up about ten miles away. The search for the horses delayed the camp's march by a day and earned Orton a "scathing rebuke" from Smith.

In 1837, Daniel S. Miles presented a complaint against Orton for "abusing Elder Brigham Young, and for a general course of unchristianlike conduct." Orton refused to respond, and he was excommunicated. After the death of Joseph Smith, Orton did not support Young's leadership. He remained in Iowa disappointed with the church leadership and disillusioned with his own decisions that had compromised his family's holdings.

Orton was restored to the church sometime before April 1845, when he was named one of the Seven Presidents of Seventies. However, Orton, who had become an alcoholic, never showed up to be ordained and never actively served. He was dropped from the quorum about a year later. He died in Lee County, Iowa in 1851.

Notes

External links
"Roger Orton", Joseph Smith Papers

1799 births
Converts to Mormonism
American Latter Day Saint missionaries
People from Geneseo, New York
1851 deaths
Presidents of the Seventy (LDS Church)
People excommunicated by the Church of Christ (Latter Day Saints)
Latter Day Saint missionaries in the United States